Maria Sergeevna Vorontsova (born 1979) is a Russian-born botanist, specializing in the taxonomy of Poaceae (grasses). She was responsible for authoring the taxon for Solanum agnewiorum and Solanum umtuma. She is a member of the Accelerated Taxonomy department at Royal Botanic Gardens, Kew. She is one of the co-authors and maintainers of GrassBase, and is an editor of the journal, Phytotaxa.

In 2010, she identified a new species of Africa spiny aubergine, Solanum ruvu, which had been collected only once in the wild ten years earlier. A subsequent expedition failed to locate it, and it is now believed to be extinct due to deforestation.

Publications

References

External links 
• Biography on Kew Science

1979 births
21st-century Russian botanists
21st-century Russian women scientists
Living people
Russian women botanists
Botanists active in Kew Gardens